David Laurent Baltase (born 29 September 1971) is a French professional football manager, who was manager of Saint Martin.

Coaching career
In 2010, he coached the Saint Martin national football team together with Jean-Louis Richards. He worked several years as a soccer coach at Casablanca American School in Morocco. In 2018, Baltase returned as manager of Saint Martin.

References

1971 births
Living people
Place of birth missing (living people)
French football managers
Saint Martin national football team managers
Expatriate football managers in the Collectivity of Saint Martin
French expatriate sportspeople in Morocco